DNA-directed RNA polymerase I subunit RPA49 is an enzyme that in humans is encoded by the POLR1E gene.

Model organisms 

Model organisms have been used in the study of POLR1E function. A conditional knockout mouse line, called Polr1etm1a(KOMP)Wtsi was generated as part of the International Knockout Mouse Consortium program—a high-throughput mutagenesis project to generate and distribute animal models of disease to interested scientists.

Male and female animals underwent a standardized phenotypic screen to determine the effects of deletion. Twenty seven tests were carried out on mutant mice and two significant abnormalities were observed.  No homozygous mutant embryos were identified during gestation, and therefore none survived until weaning. The remaining tests were carried out on heterozygous mutant adult mice; no additional significant abnormalities were observed in these animals.

Interactions 

POLR1E has been shown to interact with CD3EAP and POLR1C.

References

Further reading 

 
 
 
 
 
 
 
 
 
 
 
 

Genes mutated in mice